Bhadant Anand Kausalyayan (5 January 1905 – 22 June 1988) was a Buddhist monk, scholar, traveller and a prolific writer from India. He is considered one of the great activists of Buddhism of the 20th century. He was influenced by the Buddhist scholar and social reformer Mahapandit Rahul Sankrityayan and B. R. Ambedkar.

Personal life
Bhadant Anand Kausalyayan was born Harnam Das on 5 January 1905 in Sohana Village of Ambala District in Punjab (now in Haryana) in a Khatri family.  He did BA from National College in Lahore. His travels took him to different parts of World for promoting Buddhism like his mentor, Mahapandit Rahul Sankrityayan. He always wanted to have experience of travelling far distances across many countries and discover new things. His aim was to continue the tradition started by his inspirations. He is one of the pioneers of Indian travel literature.

Works
He contributed a lot to Indian travel literature and Hindi. He worked for Hindi Sahitya Sammelan, Prayag, Rastrabhasha Prachar Samiti, Vardha etc. He used very simple language in his books that everyone could easily understand. He wrote many essays, novels, books on his travel to different places. He also wrote many books on Buddhism. More than 20 of his books were published.

Ambedkar had lakhs of Buddhist followers, who were, after his mahaparinirvana, in need of a strong Buddhist leader, particularly in Maharashtra. Kausalyayan travelled and guided Maharashtrian Buddhists and also translated Ambedkar's work The Buddha and His Dhamma into Hindi. He also traced and collected original resources from the Tipitaka and other Buddhist literature.

He was also recognised as an India freedom fighter, he participated in  Quit India Movement with his friend Bhadant Rahul Sankrityayan.

Books

Bhikshu Ke Patra
Jo Bhul Na Saka
Aah! Aisi Daridrata
Bahanebazi
Yadi Baba Na Hote
Rail Ke Ticket
Kahan Kya Dekha
Sanskriti
Desh Ki Mitti Bulati hai
Bauddha Dharma Ek Buddiwadi Adhyayan
Shri Lanka
Hindi and Punjabi translation of B.R. Ambedkar's The Buddha and His Dhamma
Manusmriti kyon Jalai Gai?
Bhagwad Gita ki Buddhiwadi Samiksha
Ram Kahani Ram ki Jabani
An Intelligent Man's Guide to Buddhism
 Bodhidrum ke kuch panne
  Dharm Ke Naam par
  bhagvan buddha aur unke anuchar
  bhagvan buddha aur unke samkalin bhikshu
  Boudh dharma ka sar a hidi translation of essence of buddhism by P l Narsu 
  Bhadant Anand Kaushalyan jeevan va karya – by Dr. M.L. Gautam (Life and work  of Ven. Dr. Bhadant Anand Kausalyan)
  Avashyak Pali (Basic Pali) –  by Ven. Dr. Bhadant Anand Kaushalyayan
  The Gospel of Buddha : Translation by Ven. Dr. Bhadant Anand Kaushalyan of the book – The Gospel of Buddha by Paul Carus
 Dhammapada Hindi translation 
 Hindi translation of B.R. Ambedkar's Riddles in Hinduism

Notes

Indian Buddhist monks
1905 births
1988 deaths
People from Ambala district
Indian travel writers
Hindi-language writers
Writers from Punjab, India
20th-century Indian non-fiction writers
Indian male writers
20th-century Indian monks
Indian spiritual writers
20th-century Buddhist monks